The  has been awarded to photographers by the "Phototown" of Higashikawa, Hokkaidō, Japan since 1985. The Overseas and Domestic Photographer prizes are of 500,000 yen and the New Photographer and Special prizes are of 300,000 yen.

The work of twenty years' winners of the Overseas Photographer Prize was exhibited in the Tokyo Metropolitan Museum of Photography in 2006.

Notes

External links

 Hiraki Osamu. "The 21st Higashikawa Prize" (2007)
 2006 exhibition at the Tokyo Metropolitan Museum of Photography. Archived by the Wayback Machine in 2006. 

Awards established in 1985
Japanese awards
Photography awards
Photography in Japan
1985 establishments in Japan